Kubilay Sönmez (born 17 June 1994) is a Turkish professional footballer who plays as a midfielder for Bursaspor.

International career
Sönmez was born in Germany to parents of Turkish descent. He represents the Turkish Football Federation, and has represented the Turkish U20 and U21 national teams.

References

External links

1997 births
People from Kamen
Sportspeople from Arnsberg (region)
Footballers from North Rhine-Westphalia
German people of Turkish descent
Living people
German footballers
Turkish footballers
Turkey youth international footballers
Turkey under-21 international footballers
Association football midfielders
Dardanelspor footballers
Şanlıurfaspor footballers
Kayserispor footballers
Büyükşehir Belediye Erzurumspor footballers
Adana Demirspor footballers
Hatayspor footballers
Göztepe S.K. footballers
Bursaspor footballers
Süper Lig players
TFF First League players
TFF Second League players